Webber House may refer to:
 Australia
 Webber House, Brisbane, a heritage-listed building within the grounds of St John's Cathedral
 United States of America
John Lee Webber House, Yountville, California, listed on the National Register of Historic Places (NRHP) in Napa County, California
Pioneer Park (Aspen, Colorado) or Henry Webber House, NRHP-listed
Lovell-Webber House, Ionia, Michigan, listed on the NRHP in Ionia County, Michigan
Webber House (Houston, Texas), NRHP-listed
Samuel H. Webber House, Houston, Texas, listed on the NRHP in Harris County, Texas

See also
Weber House (disambiguation)